A purser is the person on a ship responsible for the handling of money on board.

Purser may also refer to:

 Purser (surname), a surname
 Purser (Pirate), the pseudonym for the Famous English Pyrat Thomas Walton; hanged 1583.

See also

 Cayley–Purser
 Purser-Hallard